René Simard,  (born October 4, 1935) is a Canadian physician, cancer researcher and university administrator.

Early life and education

Born in Montreal, Quebec, he received a Bachelor of Arts from College Saint-Laurent in 1956 and a Doctor of Medicine from the Université de Montréal in 1962. He did his residency in pathology at the Mount Sinai School of Medicine and he received a Doctor of Science from the University of Paris in 1968.

Career

From 1993 to 1998, he was the rector of the Université de Montréal.

He is a co-author of On Being Human: Where Ethics, Medicine and Spirituality Converge.

Honours

In 1989, he was made an Officer of the Order of Canada and a Fellow of the Royal Society of Canada.

References
 

1935 births
Living people
Canadian university and college chief executives
Canadian medical researchers
Fellows of the Royal Society of Canada
Officers of the Order of Canada
People from Montreal
French Quebecers
Université de Montréal alumni
University of Paris alumni